Chemical reactions